Whitestown may refer to several places in the United States:

 Whitestown, Indiana
 Whitestown, New York
 Whitestown, Wisconsin